The Veterans and People's Party (VPP) is a minor political party in the United Kingdom. It was founded in mid-May 2017 by seven British military veterans to contest the 2017 United Kingdom general election.

In the 2019 United Kingdom local elections, the party gained its first two councillors from eight fielded candidates.

In September 2019, with the  Independent Union councillors, the VPP councillor who made up the coalition at Hartlepool Borough Council defected to the Brexit Party, renaming their already existing coalition with the three Conservative councillors as the "Brexit and Conservative Coalition".

In February 2020, its councillor returned to the VPP after the government's Brexit agreement.

Hartlepool Borough Council
In May 2019, following several defections from Labour to Socialist Labour at Hartlepool Borough Council, the party's councillor joined a coalition with the Conservatives and the Independent Union, forming the largest grouping with 11 councillors, fewer than needed for control.

In September 2019, with Independent Union colleagues, he joined the Brexit Party, but returned to the VPP in early 2020.

References

2017 establishments in the United Kingdom
Eurosceptic parties in the United Kingdom
Political parties established in 2017